The 2013 East Asian Games, officially known as the VI East Asian Games, was an international multi-sport event that took place in Tianjin, China, between 6 October and 15 October 2013. 2,422 Athletes from nine East Asian nations competed in 254 events in 24 sports.

Tianjin 2013 is the last edition of East Asian Games before being replaced by East Asian Youth Games.

Organisation

Bid
In 2007, China and Mongolia entered the bidding process as potential host cities for the 6th East Asian games.

Participation

Sports
2013 East Asian Games featured 258 events in 24 sports (including 16 Olympics sports), a new record of East Asian Games history.

Swimming (40)
Diving (10)

†

†

Road Cycling (3)
BMX (2)
Indoor Cycling (5)
†
†

†

†
†

†
Taolu (12)
Sanda (8)

NB: † = Non-Olympic sports

Medal table
Key:
Final medal tally, from the official Medal Tally page.

References

External links
 Official Site

 
East Asian Games, 2013
East Asian Games
Sports competitions in Tianjin
Multi-sport events in China
International sports competitions hosted by China
East Asian Games
October 2013 sports events in Asia
21st century in Tianjin